Jack Kent Cooke (October 25, 1912 – April 6, 1997) was a Canadian-American businessman in broadcasting and professional sports. Starting in sales, Cooke was very successful, eventually becoming a partner in a network of radio stations and newspapers in Canada. After failing at starting a major league baseball team in Toronto and being turned down to own a television station in Toronto, Cooke moved to the United States and built a business empire in broadcasting and professional sports franchises. Cooke was the owner of the Washington Redskins (NFL), the Los Angeles Lakers (NBA), the Los Angeles Kings (NHL), the Los Angeles Wolves (United Soccer) and Toronto Maple Leafs (IL). He also developed The Forum in Inglewood, California, and FedExField (named  Jack Kent Cooke Stadium when it opened, months after his death) near Landover, Maryland.

Biography

Early career
Born in Hamilton, Ontario, Cooke moved with his family to The Beaches area of Toronto in 1921, where he attended Malvern Collegiate Institute.

At age 14, Cooke got a job selling encyclopedias door to door. At the end of his first day, he took home over $20 to his mother, and later claimed, "I think that was the proudest moment of my life." He later became a runner on the floor of the Toronto Stock Exchange. He was selling soap in Northern Ontario for Colgate-Palmolive in 1936 when he met Roy Thomson, who hired Cooke to run radio station CJCS in Stratford, Ontario. The two became partners in 1941, buying radio stations and newspapers in Ontario and Quebec.

Early foray in media and sports ownership
With the financial backing of J. P. Bickell, Cooke purchased CKCL (under Toronto Broadcasting Co.) in 1945, changing the call letters to CKEY. He also continued to work with Thomson, and the two acquired the Canadian edition of Liberty magazine in 1948, naming it New Liberty. The following year, Thomson sold his half of the magazine to Cooke.

In 1951, Cooke ventured into sports, acquiring the minor league Toronto Maple Leafs baseball club. He transformed the games from straight athletic contests into complete entertainment packages, with a long list of special promotions and celebrity appearances. With his focus on entertainment, Cooke was compared to St. Louis Browns owner Bill Veeck. Five months after becoming owner, Cooke presented a 48-page booklet to all the teams in the league, outlining his promotional strategies. He was named minor league executive of the year by The Sporting News in 1952. That same year, Cooke purchased Consolidated Press, publisher of Saturday Night magazine. He made an unsuccessful bid for The Globe and Mail newspaper in 1955.

While owning the Maple Leafs baseball team, Cooke set his sights on bringing Major League Baseball to Toronto. He tried to purchase the St. Louis Browns, Philadelphia Athletics, and Detroit Tigers when they came up for sale, and in 1959 he became one of the founding team owners in the Continental League, a proposed third major league for professional baseball. The league disbanded a year later without ever playing a game. Cooke still hoped to get an American League expansion team in Toronto, but the city's lack of a major league venue became an impasse. Cooke sold the Maple Leafs in 1964. Before that, he had watched several team practices and observed Sparky Anderson, noting the player's leadership qualities and ability to teach younger players from all backgrounds.  Cooke encouraged Anderson to pursue a career in managing, offering him the post for the Leafs. In 1964, Anderson accepted the offer. Cooke was inducted into the Canadian Baseball Hall of Fame in 1985.

In 1960, Cooke lost a bid to obtain a licence for the first privately-owned TV station in Toronto. There had been nine bids in a highly competitive process, and the licence was awarded to a consortium of Aldred-Rogers Broadcasting and the Telegram Corporation, which launched CFTO-TV.

Move to the United States
Within weeks of being turned down for the Toronto TV licence, Cooke applied for U.S. citizenship. With the support of United States House Congressman Francis E. Walter (D-PA), Cooke quickly became a citizen when both houses of Congress and President Dwight D. Eisenhower approved a waiver of the usual five-year waiting period. He sold CKEY at the end of 1960 and Consolidated Press in 1961.

At the time, Canada and the U.S. both had laws prohibiting foreign control of radio and TV stations. Cooke had entered the U.S. broadcasting industry in August 1959 by acquiring Pasadena, California radio station KRLA 1110 (now KRDC) through his brother, Donald Cooke, a U.S. citizen.

Cooke formed American Cablevision in the 1960s and acquired several cable television companies. He acquired majority ownership of TelePrompTer cable TV, and sold it in the late 1970s for $646 million. In 1979, he bought the Chrysler Building in New York City, one of the world's most renowned skyscrapers. In 1985, Cooke bought the Los Angeles Daily News for $176 million. A year later, he acquired another cable TV company. He sold the cable systems in 1989.

Sports ownership

Washington Redskins
In 1961, Cooke purchased a 25% interest in the Washington Redskins after team owner and founder George Preston Marshall became incapacitated by a stroke; Cooke became majority owner in 1974 and sole owner in 1985.

While he was owner of the Redskins, the team won three Super Bowls under head coach Joe Gibbs (in 1982, 1987, and 1991), the franchise's first championships since the 1940s.

In 1997, Cooke completed a stadium deal near Landover, Maryland, for a new home for his team. This community was named Raljon—a name devised by Cooke by combining the names of his sons Ralph and John. Shortly afterward, Cooke died of cardiac arrest. The stadium, still in use by the franchise to this day, was posthumously named Jack Kent Cooke Stadium. In 1999, under subsequent ownership, the stadium's name was changed to FedExField (the Raljon name was discontinued at the same time).

In his will, Cooke left the team and the stadium to his foundation with instructions to sell it. Cooke's son John tried to put in a competitive bid to keep the team in the family, but the franchise instead was sold to a consortium led by local businessman Daniel Snyder for a record-setting $800 million.

Los Angeles Lakers
In September 1965, Cooke purchased the Los Angeles Lakers for $5 million ($ in current dollar terms) from Bob Short. Under Cooke's ownership the Lakers moved from the Los Angeles Memorial Sports Arena to The Forum and changed their colors from Royal and Light Blue to the current Purple (which he referred to as "Forum Blue") and Gold.

The Lakers during Cooke's ownership reached seven NBA Finals and won the 1972 NBA Finals. In 1979, Cooke sold both the Lakers and the Los Angeles Kings.

Los Angeles Kings
As a Canadian, Cooke particularly enjoyed ice hockey, and he was determined to bring the National Hockey League (NHL) to Los Angeles. In 1966, the NHL announced it intended to sell six new franchises, and Cooke prepared a bid. The Los Angeles Memorial Coliseum Commission, which operated the Sports Arena, supported a competing bid headed by Los Angeles Rams owner Dan Reeves, and advised Cooke that if he won the franchise he would not be allowed to use that facility. In response, Cooke threatened to build a new arena in the Los Angeles suburb of Inglewood. Nearly 30 years later Cooke told the Los Angeles Times sportswriter Steve Springer that he recalled "one official representing the commission laughing at him" (Springer's words) when Cooke warned he would build in Inglewood. Cooke won the franchise, and paid $2 million for the new Los Angeles NHL club, which he called the "Kings." Springer: "Cooke went to Inglewood and built the Forum. Good-bye, Lakers. Good-bye, Kings." The Kings played their first game on October 14, 1967—at the Long Beach Arena, while construction was being completed at Cooke's new arena.

Cooke claimed The Forum would be "the most beautiful arena in the world." It opened December 30, 1967, to rave reviews. Cooke was soon calling it "The Fabulous Forum." The Kings struggled both on the ice and at the gate, however. Cooke had been told that there were more than 300,000 former Canadians living within a three-hour drive of Los Angeles, and remarked, "Now I know why they left Canada: They hate hockey!"

In 1979, Cooke sold the Forum, the Kings, and the Lakers to Dr. Jerry Buss for a then-record $67.5 million ($ in current dollar terms); half of the payment was in cash and half was in real estate, with part of Buss's payment including the Chrysler Building.

Los Angeles Wolves
In 1967, Cooke was a founder of the United Soccer Association and owned the Los Angeles Wolves team, which became a charter NASL team the following year.

Boxing 
In 1971, Cooke was a financial backer of the first Muhammad Ali vs Joe Frazier boxing match, held at Madison Square Garden and won by Frazier.

Elmendorf Farm
A lover of horses and a fan of Thoroughbred horse racing, Cooke owned Kent Farms, a  estate in Middleburg, Virginia, not far from Washington, D.C. In December 1984 he purchased the historic Elmendorf Farm in Lexington, Kentucky from the estate of Maxwell Gluck. He bred and raced a number of successful horses, notably Flying Continental, sired by Flying Paster, whose wins included the 1990 Jockey Club Gold Cup.

Personal life

Cooke was married five times, however his last two marriages were to the same woman, Marlene Ramallo Chalmers. He was married to Chalmers at the time of his death.

Cooke's first marriage, his longest, lasted 45 years. He and Barbara Jean Carnegie married in 1934, divorcing in 1979. In the legal action, Carnegie was awarded what was then the largest divorce settlement in history — $42 million ($ in current dollar terms). The presiding judge during the bench trial was Joseph Wapner, who later became famous as the judge on television's The People's Court. Cooke and Carnegie had two sons: John Kent Cooke and Ralph Kent Cooke.

On October 31, 1980, Cooke married Jeanne Maxwell Williams, a sculptor from Las Vegas. The marriage lasted 10 months. It ended with a $1 million ($ in current dollar terms) divorce settlement.

Cooke's third marriage on July 24, 1987, to Suzanne Elizabeth Martin, a college dropout aged 31 at the time and 43 years his junior, was even shorter at 73 days. Cooke agreed to marry Martin if she signed a prenuptial agreement and aborted the first-trimester fetus she was carrying (as a result of having skipped taking one or two birth control pills). It would have been her third abortion in two years. After their wedding, Martin told Cooke she had changed her mind, deciding to keep the baby, and she and Cooke separated four weeks later. After they divorced, Martin gave birth to a girl who was named Jacqueline Kent Cooke. In her divorce action, where her lawyers used the child as a "wedge", Martin sought $15 million ($ in current dollar terms) from Cooke, plus $18,000 ($ in current dollar terms) a month in alimony and child support. In Fauquier County Circuit Court, a judge rejected Martin's request that he ignore the prenuptial agreement, and improve her financial settlement in which she received a $75,000 ($ in current dollar terms) annual stipend, a Jaguar, and the use for five years of an apartment in the Watergate complex. Cooke's lawyer Milton Gould said: "This is a conspiracy to try to use a little kid as a means of getting money. Well, we're not going to abandon this child. She will get money but the woman doesn't deserve any...there have been few courtesans in the history of the world who have been as well rewarded as this one."

Cooke married his fourth wife, Marlene Ramallo Chalmers, who had been jailed for three months for a 1986 arrest for cocaine trafficking, on May 5, 1990. They were divorced in late 1993 after she made headlines in September by driving drunk in the Georgetown section of Washington, D.C. with a man holding onto the hood and pounding on the windshield of her car. They remarried in 1995 and remained together until his death.

Cooke, who had famously informed a reporter that "I don't intend to die," died of congestive heart failure on  April 6, 1997, at George Washington University Hospital in Washington, D.C. A memorial service was held at Trinity Episcopal Church in Upperville, Virginia, on April 10 and was attended by more than 400 Washington and sports dignitaries.

Cooke's will, which revealed his many changes of heart regarding his wives and children, received considerable public attention. His will gave his daughter Jacqueline a trust fund of $5 million ($ in current dollar terms) but nothing to her mother, Suzanne Elizabeth Martin, "because of her misconduct and behavior which were calculated to harm me". His final wife, Marlene Ramallo Chalmers, was also cut out of his will; she filed a lawsuit against Cooke's estate and reportedly received $20 million in a settlement about a year after Cooke's death.

The bulk of Cooke's $825 million estate went into establishing the Jack Kent Cooke Foundation, whose stated mission was to "help young people of exceptional promise reach their full potential through education."

In February 2007, his daughter Jacqueline filed a $275 million lawsuit against the estate, seeking more money than her $5 million trust fund.

Awards and honors
 3× Super Bowl champion (XVII, XXII, XXVI; as owner of the Washington Redskins)
 Washington Commanders Ring of Fame
 NBA champion (1972; as owner of the Los Angeles Lakers)

References

Other sources
Jack Kent Cooke: A Career Biography, by Adrian Kinnane, Jack Kent Cooke Foundation, 2004

External links
 

1912 births
1997 deaths
American sports businesspeople
American racehorse owners and breeders
American soccer chairmen and investors
Businesspeople from Ontario
Canadian media executives
Canadian sports businesspeople
Canadian soccer chairmen and investors
Canadian radio company founders
Los Angeles Kings owners
Los Angeles Lakers owners
Toronto Maple Leafs (International League)
Continental League contributors
North American Soccer League (1968–1984) executives
Canadian Baseball Hall of Fame inductees
People from Hamilton, Ontario
Canadian emigrants to the United States
20th-century American businesspeople
20th-century American philanthropists
Washington Redskins owners